Thauera chlorobenzoica is a bacterium from the genus of Thauera.

References

External links
Type strain of Thauera chlorobenzoica at BacDive -  the Bacterial Diversity Metadatabase

Rhodocyclaceae
Bacteria described in 2001